Sega GT 2002 is a sim racing video game published by Sega in 2002. It is the sequel to Wow Entertainment's Sega GT. Following its initial release as a retail game, it was given away on a disc with Jet Set Radio Future in specially-marked Xbox console packages. Sega released Sega GT Online for the following year, with extra cars and an online facility to be used with the Xbox Live.

Game features
This is the only GT-style game that allows the player to select their opponents directly. Unlike the original game, there are no works cars to win anymore, even though old racing cars can still be won from races. Some prizes are "special prizes" that can only be won by doing a certain objective. The game makes use of a "damage meter" in lieu of rendered damage, but while it does not affect the handling, it will reduce the awarded prize money at the end of the race. When the player finishes the race with the car unscratched, the game will award a bonus cash prize. In turn, the player will either finish with more or less than the prize money advertised, depending on the meter. Unlike Gran Turismo, the license tests are merely timed laps, instead of separate tests focusing on specific elements of driving.

Game modes

Sega GT 2002: The players start with just $13,000 to buy a car, raising money to buy faster cars and becoming the Official Race champion.

Quick Battle: Racing a single race against a CPU or human opponent, or alternatively, watching a CPU race.

Chronicle Mode: The players can use classic cars from the 1960s and early 1970s, tune them up over time, and try to defeat newer cars.

Time Attack: The players can try and beat own fastest lap-time on any circuit in the game.

Replay Studio: Viewing and editing saved replays.

Online
Sega GT Online was released in Japan in 2003 and the US and Europe in 2004. It featured the addition of "over 40" new cars (now 165+) including Auto Union, Bugatti, and De Tomaso vehicles. Opel vehicles have been removed from this version, while some new tracks, new weather/time of day, new game modes such as "Gathering Mode" were added to arcade mode and "Special Time Triggered Events" for online. Unlike the regular version, it was rated T due to the unpredictable multiplayer interactions. Its cover features a Mazda RX-8.

Reception

Sega GT 2002

Sega GT 2002 received "favorable" reviews according to the review aggregation website Metacritic. In Japan, Famitsu gave it a score of 35 out of 40. It was nominated for GameSpots annual "Best Driving Game on Xbox" award, which went to Rallisport Challenge.

Sega GT Online

The online version received a bit more "average" reviews than the original Sega GT 2002 according to Metacritic. In Japan, Famitsu also gave it a score of one eight, one seven, and two eights for a total of 31 out of 40.

References

External links
 
 

2002 video games
Cancelled Dreamcast games
Multiplayer online games
Racing video games
Racing simulators
Pack-in video games
Video games developed in Japan
WOW Entertainment games
Xbox games
Xbox-only games